Clytra atraphaxidis is a species of leaf beetles in the subfamily Cryptocephalinae. It can be found in Southern Europe, Asia Minor, Central Asia, Mongolia and Korea.

Subspecies
Clytra atraphaxidis atraphaxidis (Pallas, 1773)
Clytra atraphaxidis maculifrons (Zoubokoff, 1833)
Clytra atraphaxidis sierrana (Daniel, 1903)

References

Beetles described in 1773
Beetles of Asia
Beetles of Europe
Clytrini
Taxa named by Peter Simon Pallas